Guillermo Tamez (born 5 March 1966) is a Mexican boxer. He competed in the men's lightweight event at the 1988 Summer Olympics. At the 1988 Summer Olympics, he lost to Sean Knight of Barbados.

References

External links
 

1966 births
Living people
Mexican male boxers
Olympic boxers of Mexico
Boxers at the 1988 Summer Olympics
Place of birth missing (living people)
Lightweight boxers